The Eleventh Amendment of the Constitution of India, officially known as The Constitution (Eleventh Amendment) Act, 1961, provided that the Vice-President shall be elected by the members of an electoral college consisting of the members of both Houses of Parliament, thereby dispensing with the earlier requirement of a joint meeting of members of both Houses of Parliament assembled for the said purpose. The 11th Amendment inserted a new clause (4) in article 71 of the Constitution to clarify that the election of President or Vice-President cannot be challenged on the ground of the existence of any vacancy for whatever reason in the appropriate electoral college.

Text

The full text of  clause (1) of article 66, after the 11th Amendment is given below:

Proposal and enactment
The Constitution (Eleventh Amendment) Bill, 1961 (Bill No. 66 of 1961) was introduced in the Lok Sabha on 30 November 1961. It was introduced by Ashoke Kumar Sen, then Minister of Law, and sought to amend articles 66 and 71 of the Constitution. The full text of the Statement of Objects and Reasons appended to the bill is given below: The full text of the Statement of Objects and Reasons appended to the bill is given below:

The bill was debated and passed in the original form by the Lok Sabha on 5 December 1961. It was considered and passed by the Rajya Sabha on 12 December 1961. The bill received assent from then President Rajendra Prasad on 19 December 1961, and came into force on the same date. It was notified in The Gazette of India on 20 December 1961.

See also
List of amendments of the Constitution of India

References

11
1961 in India
1961 in law
Nehru administration